Margaret Ann "Peggy" Krusick (born October 26, 1956) is a retired American Democratic politician.  She was a member of the Wisconsin State Assembly for nearly thirty years (1983–2013), representing central Milwaukee County. She was defeated in a primary challenge after redistricting, and lost a subsequent write-in campaign.

Background 
Peggy Krusick is a graduate of Saint Gregory the Great Parish School and Hamilton High School, both in Milwaukee. She received her B.A. in Political Science, with honors, from the University of Wisconsin–Milwaukee. She and her husband have two children.

State Assembly 
Krusick was first elected in 1983, to represent the 17th Assembly District. Prior to the 2011 Redistricting Act, the district covered the southwest side of Milwaukee and most of Greenfield. The district now includes West Milwaukee, and parts of Milwaukee's south side, West Allis and Greenfield, but only about one third of Krusick's old district.

Krusick was a member of the Assembly Committee on Jobs, Economy and Small Business and the Assembly Committee on Aging and Long-Term Care.

Krusick's anti-abortion position garnered an endorsement from Wisconsin Right to Life.

Loss of nomination 
On August 14, 2012, Krusick was defeated in the Democratic primary by Daniel Riemer, a 25-year-old law student and son of an advisor to former Wisconsin Governor Jim Doyle. She was one of two veteran Milwaukee-area Democratic incumbents (the other being Jason Fields) to be unseated in that August primary by challengers who argued that the incumbent was too conservative to represent the district properly.

Write-in campaign 
In 2012, Krusick ran a write-in campaign against Riemer in the November general election. She ran a direct mail campaign that talked about her "independent track record". Riemer won the election with 16,664 votes (85.4%) to Krusick's 2499 (12.8%), with 361 other votes (1.8%).

References

External links
Peggy Krusick, Wisconsin Historical Society
Peggy Krusick's 2010 campaign website

1956 births
Living people
Members of the Wisconsin State Assembly
Politicians from Milwaukee
University of Wisconsin–Milwaukee alumni
Women state legislators in Wisconsin
21st-century American politicians
21st-century American women politicians